Costa Rica is administratively divided into seven provinces which are subdivided into 84 cantons, and these are further subdivided into districts. Cantons are the only administrative division in Costa Rica that possess local government in the form of municipalities. Each municipality has its own mayor and several representatives, all of them chosen via municipal elections every four years.

The original 14 cantons were established in 1848, and the number has risen gradually by the division of existing cantons. The newest canton, Monteverde, was created on September 29, 2021 from the canton of Puntarenas.

The smallest canton by population is Turrubares with  residents.

Political structure

Each canton is controlled by a government unit called Municipalidad. The term reflects the fact that the cantons in Costa Rica have approximately the same function as municipios ("municipalities") in many other Spanish-speaking countries. This administrative unit consists of two bodies: a municipal council (Concejo Municipal) and an executive officer called a mayor (alcalde / alcaldesa municipal), a title that was introduced in 1998.

The mayor's main duties are to liaise with the municipal council, district councils and the entire administrative apparatus of the canton, and to approve and implement the decisions taken by the municipal council. The number of members of the municipal council varies from one canton to another, and they are elected by local elections held every four years. The head of the council is titled the municipal president (presidente municipal). The council's main task is to manage the canton at the local level, and is responsible for planning basic policies and establishing budgets. More specifically, the responsibilities include urban and agricultural planning and organizing cultural affairs, health care, education and industry. Each municipal president appoints a number of working commissions that deal with issues specific to the municipality.

Cities in Costa Rica
According to the Executive Decree N°41548-MGP, a city in Costa Rica is a ceremonial title awarded to a district or districts which contain the administrative center regardless of factors such as population, population density, or economic indicators.

Cantons

See also
 Provinces of Costa Rica
 Districts of Costa Rica

References

 
Subdivisions of Costa Rica
Costa Rica, Cantons
Costa Rica 2
Cantons, Costa Rica
Cantons
Costa Rica